Johann "Hans" Tandler was an Austrian international footballer. At club level, he played for Vienna Cricket and Football-Club, SV Amateure, New York Giants and Austria Wien. He made 18 appearances for the Austria national team, scoring three goals.

After retiring he managed Galatasaray for one year.

External links
 
 

Association football defenders
Austrian footballers
Austria international footballers
FK Austria Wien players
OGC Nice players
Austrian football managers
OGC Nice managers
Galatasaray S.K. (football) managers
1901 births
1959 deaths